Cosimo de Torres also Cosmo de Torres and Cosma de Torres (1584–1642) was a Roman Catholic cardinal who served as Cardinal-Priest of Santa Maria in Trastevere (1641–1642), Cardinal-Priest of San Pancrazio (1623–1641), Archbishop of Monreale (1634–1642), Bishop of Perugia (1624–1634), Apostolic Nuncio to Poland (1621–1622), and Titular Archbishop of Hadrianopolis in Haemimonto (1621–1622).

Biography
Cosimo de Torres was born to a noble family in Rome, Italy in 1584, the son of Marchis Giovanni de Torres and Giulia Mattei, princess of Papareschi. His family was of Spanish descent having moved from Málaga, Spain in the early 16th century. His uncles Girolamo Mattei (named cardinal in 1586) and Ludovico de Torres, iuniore (named cardinal in 1606) were also cardinals. Torres obtained a doctorate in utroque iure in canon and civil law from the University of Perugia. After school, he was assigned to the college of protonotaries apostolic under the guidance of his uncle, Cardinal Mattei. In 1608, he served on the Referendary of the Tribunals of the Apostolic Signature of Justice and of Grace.

On March 17, 1621, he was elected during the papacy of Pope Gregory XV as Titular Archbishop of Hadrianopolis in Haemimonto with special dispensation for not yet receiving the presbyterate. On April 25, 1621, he was consecrated bishop in the  church of S. Andrea della Valle by Maffeo Barberini, Cardinal-Priest of Sant'Onofrio, with Diofebo Farnese, Titular Patriarch of Jerusalem, and Ulpiano Volpi, Bishop of Novara,  serving as co-consecrators. Giovanni Mascardi, Bishop of Nebbio, was consecrated in the same ceremony.

On May 21, 1621, he was appointed during the papacy of Pope Gregory XV as Apostolic Nuncio to Poland where he served until December 2, 1622. On September 5, 1622, he was elevated to Cardinal by Pope Gregory XV in the Consistory of 1622 and installed on March 20, 1623 with the title of Cardinal-Priest of San Pancrazio. On May 22, 1623, he was named to the Prefect of the S.C. of the Tridentine Council where he served until 1626. He successively served as Abbot of S. Maria di Perno; Abbot of S. Giovanni di Tremisto; and Abbot of S. Nicola di Mamola.
was
As cardinal, he participated in the Conclave of 1623 which elected Pope Urban VIII. On September 16, 1624, he was appointed during the papacy of Pope Urban VIII as Bishop of Perugia. On January 9, 1634, he was appointed as Camerlengo of the Sacred College of Cardinals where he served until January 8, 1635. On April 3, 1634, he was appointed during the papacy of Pope Urban VIII as Archbishop of Monreale which had previously been occupied by both his grand-uncle Ludovico II de Torres and his uncle Cardinal Ludovico III de Torres. On July 1, 1641, he was appointed by Pope Urban VIII as Cardinal-Priest of Santa Maria in Trastevere.

Torres died on May 1, 1642 in Rome from dropsy and is buried in the church of S. Pancrazio in Rome.

Episcopal succession

References

External links and additional sources
 (for Chronology of Bishops)
 (for Chronology of Bishops)
 (for Chronology of Bishops)
 (for Chronology of Bishops)

17th-century Roman Catholic archbishops in Sicily
Bishops appointed by Pope Gregory XV
Bishops appointed by Pope Urban VIII
1584 births
1642 deaths